Vladimer Omarovich "Lado" Gogoladze (born 18 August 1966), is a retired Georgian gymnast.

Gogoladze began competing at the elite level in 1985, at the age of 18, taking silver medals in the all-around and high bar in the USSR Championships, and bronze medals at the European Championships in the all-around and parallel bars.

He was a member of the Soviet "Dream Team" who won the team gold at the 1988 Seoul Olympic Games, and he is also known for being the first gymnast to perform a triple back on floor in the Olympics.  In the same year, he received the title Honored Master of Sports of the USSR.

According to a report in Sovietsky Sport, Gogoladze and teammate Dmitri Bilozerchev were removed from the Soviet men's squad for the 1989 World Championships because of a two-day drinking binge.

Gogoladze has two elements named after him.  The first is a straddled Healy twirl on parallel bars.  The second, on floor exercise, is a flair or circle to handstand, then continuing to flair or circle; this element is frequently performed and remains in the current Code of Points.

Gogoladze now coaches at Gymnastics World in Ohio.

References

External links 
 Olympic Statistics Online at sports-reference.com
 Crystal Lake Gymnastics Training Center

Living people
1966 births
Soviet male artistic gymnasts
Olympic gold medalists for the Soviet Union
Medalists at the 1988 Summer Olympics
Recipients of the Presidential Order of Excellence
Gymnasts at the 1988 Summer Olympics
Olympic gymnasts of the Soviet Union
Olympic medalists in gymnastics